The Brescia Arsenal was a small arms factory located in Brescia, Italy, and active from the early 19th century to the end of World War II.
Initially it was built as a convent for Servite monks in the 15th century, and maintained a religious destination until the end of the 18th century.
Following Napoleonic suppressions the convent was turned into barracks and, in 1812, the production of small arms was started. Many kinds of small arms in use by the Regio Esercito were overhauled in the Brescia Arsenal, including the Vetterli rifle and the Carcano rifle in its many versions. Built-in assembly lines produced thousands of the latter, including the entire lot of the M91 TS (Special Troops) Carbine, made between 1898 and 1919. Ammunition was also produced.

On 2 March 1945 the military facility was targeted by a massive USAAF air raid that wrought damage all over the city. The Arsenal was leveled and the church of St. Afra (now Saint Angela Merici) in "Via dell'Arsenale" (now via Francesco Crispi) was directly hit and collapsed causing the death of 21 people who had sought refuge there. The total death toll for the bombing was of 80 killed among the population.

After World War II the building was named after Sottotenente Serafino Gnutti, an Alpini officer who had earned a posthumous Gold Medal of Military Valor in the Greco-Italian War. The Headquarters and Signals section of Brigata Meccanizzata "Brescia" were accommodated there. 
Following the post-Cold War reorganization of the Italian Army, the Brigata was disbanded and the barracks were left empty. As of August 2010, they have been alienated by the Ministry of Defence to be turned into flats and offices.

References

External links
  https://web.archive.org/web/20100829081314/http://www.museonastroazzurro.it/i-pezzi/24-tenente-serafino-gnutti.html Page on Serafino Gnutti - "Nastro Azzurro" museum.

Arsenals
Firearm manufacturers of Italy